(まつだ さだつぐ) (2 November 1906 – 20 January 2003, Tokyo, Japan) was a Japanese film director. He directed films from 1925 to 1969.

His name is also incorrectly spelled as Sadaji Matsuda.

He was the son of producer and director Shōzō Makino, and brother of film director Masahiro Makino

Partial filmography 
 (獄門島 Gokumon-to) (1949)
 Kojiki Taishō (1952)
 Akō Rōshi: Ten no Maki, Chi no Maki (赤穂浪士　天の巻　地の巻 Akō Rōshi: Ten no Maki, Chi no Maki) (1956)
 (任侠清水港 Ninkyō Shimizu-minato) (1957)
 Akō Rōshi (赤穂浪士 Akō Rōshi) (1961)

References

External links 
  http://www.jmdb.ne.jp/person/p0187460.htm
 
 
 

1906 births
2003 deaths
Japanese film directors
Samurai film directors
People from Tokyo